The 2018–19 season was the 50th campaign of the Scottish Basketball Championship, the national basketball league of Scotland. 19 teams were split into Division 1, featuring 10 teams, and Division 2, featuring 9 teams. Dunfermline Reign won their first league title.

Format
In Division 1, each team plays each other twice, once home, once away, for a total of 18 games.

In Division 2, each team plays each other twice, once home, once away, for a total of 16 games.

Division 1

Teams

Promoted to Division 1
 Edinburgh Lions
Relegated from Division 1
 Pleasance

League table

Playoffs
Quarter-finals

Semi-finals

Final

Division 2

Teams

Promoted to Division 1
 Edinburgh Lions
Relegated from Division 1
 Pleasance
New team
 North Lanarkshire Chiefs

League table

Playoffs
Semi-finals

Final

Promotion playoff

Scottish Cup
Scottish Cup (basketball)

1st Round

2nd Round

Quarter-finals

Semi-finals

Final

References

Scottish Basketball Championship Men seasons
Scotland
Scotland
basketball
basketball